Keratotomy is a type of  refractive surgical procedure and can refer to:

 Radial keratotomy
 Photorefractive keratotomy

See also

 
 
 List of -otomies